Kazimierz Wojciechowski, SDB (16 August 1904, in Jasło – 27 June 1941, at Auschwitz) was a Polish Catholic priest, a member of the Salesians of Don Bosco. He was involved in the education of the youth, and after the Nazi invasion of Poland was arrested by the Gestapo, imprisoned at Montelupich, and subsequently deported to the Auschwitz concentration camp, where he was murdered by two prisoner functionaries the day after arrival.

Life and death
Wojciechowski was born in the southern Polish city of Jasło, some 144 kilometres (90 miles) east of Cracow, one of the three children of Andrzej Wojciechowski, a railway employee, and his wife Marja Wojciechowska (née Boskówna). His father died when Wojciechowski was five-years' old. Owing to the efforts of his mother struggling single-handedly to support the family he was enrolled at the age of 8 at the Salesian-run boarding school for poor children (the Zakład Salezjański im. Lubo­mir­skich w Krakowie) located in the ulica Rakowicka № 27 in Cracow. At school he was described as a vivacious and content child. In 1916 he entered a similar Silesian institution for older children located at the city of Oświęcim (the future site of Auschwitz during the Second World War) where in 1920 (while in the fourth year of the gimnazjum) he expressed the wish to enter the Salesian novitiate in Klecza Dolna. Accepted by the Salesians of Don Bosco, he professed his religious vows on 2  October 1921. Subsequently, he continued his studies at a Salesian academy in Cracow (the Wyższe Seminarium Duchowne Towarzystwa Salezjańskiego), and upon their completion was given a position at a minor seminary of the Salesians at Ląd in central Poland as an assistant tutor in mathematics and a singing-teacher (see picture to the right). He began his theological studies at Cracow in 1930, and upon their completion received holy orders at the hands of Bishop Stanisław Rospond (18771958) on 19 May 1935. He then taught for a year at a Salesian minor seminary in  near Stryj in Poland (now Stryi in Ukraine), on his return to Cracow taking on the duties of a catechist in elementary schools and those of a director of an oratorium and patron of Catholic youth organizations.

During the September Campaign Wojciechowski remained in Cracow rendering assistance to persons displaced by the hostilities of war. When the Nazis allowed the opening of schools in the General Government in November 1939, he returned to his school work.

In the evening hours of Friday, 23 May 1941, Wojciechowski  together with eleven of his Salesian confrères, including ten priests and one lay friar  was arrested by the Gestapo at the house in the ulica Konfederacka № 6 in the Dębniki district of Cracow (the site of a Salesian parish; see picture to the right) and imprisoned in the ulica Montelupich. At the Montelupich Prison Wojciechowski was informed that the reason for his arrest was his educational work fanning the patriotic sentiment among the Polish youth. After a detention of 34 days in duration at Montelupich, Wojciechowski was deported on 26 June 1941 to the nearby Auschwitz concentration camp, 66 km (41 miles) away. On arrival at the camp he received the inmate number 17342. The next day, 27 June 1941, Wojciechowski was impressed into a disciplinary work detail, the so-called Straf­kompanie consisting of 12 prisoners engaged in gruelling excavation of the gravel yard that bordered on the concentration camp  the now famous historic site known in Polish as Żwirowisko and in German as Kiesplatz. During the morning shift of that day the supervising kapo broke Wojciechowski's teeth with a single blow from a shovel handle and separately injured his head with a lash from a riding crop. He had apparently attracted the attention of the kapo by his athletic and muscular build, which incited jealousy.  This was also the time frame within which two of Wojciechowski's fellow-Salesians, Ignacy Dobiasz and Jan Świerc, were murdered and removed to crematorium. During the lunch break Wojciechowski was unable to eat on account of the sustained wounds. On the afternoon shift he was beaten again and when he complained he was thrown into a previously excavated gravel pit, told to lie down next to another Salesian friar, Franciszek Harazim (18851941; inmate number 17375), whom he observed lying at the bottom of the pit in a state of unconsciousness, and together with him was suffocated to death by having a single wooden pole thrown across both his and Harazim's necks, which was then weighed down by the bodies of two prisoner functionaries  a kapo and a barrack leader (blockälteste)  who stood on the pole at either end. Wojciechowski was 36-years' old.

Kazimierz Wojciechowski is currently one of the 122 Polish martyrs of the Second World War who are included in the beatification process initiated in 1994, whose first beatification session was held in Warsaw in 2003 (see Słudzy Boży). A person nominated for beatification receives within the Roman Catholic Church the title of "Servant of God"; once he is actually beatified he is accorded the title of "Venerable" and "Blessed", which are a prerequisite for sainthood conferred in a process known as canonization.

In all, over 140 Polish Salesian friars found themselves imprisoned, deported to concentration camps, or exiled from the country during the Second World War.

Bibliography
Jacek Chrobaczyński, Słownik biograficzny nauczycieli w Małopolsce w latach II wojny światowej, 19391945: ofiary wojny, żołnierze, działacze konspiracyjni, nauczyciele w jawnym i tajnym szkolnictwie, Cracow, Wydawnictwo Naukowe WSP [ Wyższej Szkoły Pedagogicznej ], 1995, page 247. . (A biographical dictionary of Lesser Poland-region teachers martyred during the Second World War.)
Waldemar Żurek, Męczennik Żwirowiska: Sługa Boży ks. Kazimierz Wojciechowski SDB (19041941), Cracow, Wydawnictwo Poligrafia Salezjańska, 2005. , . (The title translates as "The Martyr of the Gravel Pit".)
Biography on the Biuletyn Informacyjny "Męczennicy" of Pelplin (see online).

See also
108 Martyrs of World War II
Servant of God
List of Servants of God

References

External links
Picture of Kazimierz Wojciechowski with a complete list of Salesian Martyrs

1904 births
1941 deaths
Polish people who died in Auschwitz concentration camp
Polish beatified people
Clergy from Kraków
People from Jasło
Polish civilians killed in World War II
Polish Servants of God
20th-century venerated Christians